Seder Olam Rabbah ("The Great Order of the World") is a 2nd-century CE Hebrew language chronology detailing the dates of biblical events from creation to Alexander the Great's conquest of Persia. It adds no stories beyond what is in the biblical text, and addresses such questions as the age of Isaac at his binding and the number of years that Joshua led the Israelites. Tradition considers it to have been written about 160 CE by Jose ben Halafta, but it was probably also supplemented and edited at a later period.

Name
In the Babylonian Talmud this chronicle is several times referred to simply as Seder Olam, and it is quoted as such by the more ancient biblical commentators, including Rashi. But starting in the 12th century, it began to be designated as Seder Olam Rabbah to distinguish it from a later, smaller chronicle, Seder Olam Zuṭa; it was first so designated by Abraham ben Nathan Ha-Yarhi.

Structure
In its present form, Seder Olam Rabbah consists of 30 chapters, each 10 chapters forming a section or "gate."

The work is a chronological record, extending from Adam to the revolt of Bar Kokba in the reign of Hadrian, the Persian period being compressed into 52 years. The chronicle is complete only up to the time of Alexander the Great; the period from Alexander to Hadrian occupies a very small portion of the work—the end of the 30th chapter.

It has been concluded, therefore, that originally Seder Olam was more extensive and consisted of two parts, the second of which, dealing with the post-Alexandrian period, has been lost, with the exception of a small fragment that was added by the copyists to the first part.

Many passages quoted in the Talmud are missing in the edition of Seder Olam which has survived.

Methodology 
The author probably designed the work for calendrical purposes, to determine the era of the creation; his system, adopted as early as the 3rd century CE, is still followed. Adhering closely to the Pharisaic interpretations of Bible texts, he endeavored not only to elucidate many passages, but also to determine certain dates which are not indicated in the Bible, but which may be inferred by calculation.

In many cases, however, he gave the dates according to tradition, and inserted, besides, the sayings and halakhot of preceding rabbis and of his contemporaries. In discussing biblical chronology he followed three principles:
 To assume that the intention of the biblical author was, wherever possible, to give exact dates
 To assign to each of a series of events the shortest possible duration of time, where necessary, in order to secure agreement with the biblical text
 To adopt the lesser of two possible numbers.

Chronology

The current Hebrew calendar year numbering system, which counts years from the creation, has been in use for more than 1000 years. The dating system of numbering the years from creation was adopted sometime before 3925 Anno Mundi (165 CE), and based on the calculation of Rabbi Yose ben Halafta during about 160 CE in the book Seder Olam Rabbah.

These years are based on the computations of dates and periods found in the Hebrew Bible. In Jewish tradition, "Year 1" is considered to have begun on the 25 of Elul, 6 days before the beginning of "Year 2" on the first of Tishrei, when Adam was created. The new moon of its first month (Tishrei) is designated molad tohu (meaning new moon of chaos or nothing). By Halafta's calculation Adam was created during the year 3761 BCE. However, Seder Olam Rabbah treats the creation of Adam as the beginning of "Year Zero". This results in a two-year discrepancy between the years given in Seder Olam Rabbah and the Jewish year used now. For example, Seder Olam Rabbah gives the year of the Exodus from Egypt as 2448 AM; but, according to the current system, the year would be 2450 AM.

Despite the computations by Yose ben Halafta, confusion persisted for a long time as to how the calculations should be applied. During 1000, for example, the Muslim chronologist al-Biruni noted that three different epochs were used by various Jewish communities being one, two, or three years later than the modern epoch. The epoch seems to have been settled by 1178, when Maimonides, in his work Mishneh Torah, described all of the modern rules of the Hebrew calendar, including the modern epochal year. His work has been accepted by Jews as definitive, though it does not correspond to the scientific calculations. For example, the Jewish year for the destruction of the First Temple has traditionally been given as 3338 AM or 423/2 BC. This differs from the modern scientific year, which is usually expressed using the Proleptic Julian calendar as 587 BC. The scientific date takes into account evidence from the ancient Babylonian calendar and its astronomical observations. So, too, according to Jewish computation, the destruction of the Second Temple occurred in the lunar month of Av in anno 68 CE, rather than in 70 CE. In this and related cases, a difference between the traditional Jewish year and a scientific date in a Gregorian year or in a proleptic Julian calendar date results from a disagreement about when the event happened—and not simply a difference between the Jewish and Gregorian calendars (see the "Missing Years" in the Jewish Calendar and below, Excursus: Jewish Chronology in the Scroll of Antiochus).

In Jewish thought the counting is usually considered to be from the creation of the world, as has been emphasized in many ancient texts dealing with creation chronology, viz. that the six days of creation till man are literal days—including the days before the creation of the sun and earth.  However, some understand these days metaphorically.

Genesis to the period of the Judges
According to Genesis, the confusion of languages took place in the days of Peleg. Seder Olam attempts to identify when exactly in Peleg's life this occurred. It concludes that the first year of Peleg's life cannot be meant (as at the time of the confusion Peleg had a younger brother, Joktan, who had several children); nor could it have occurred during the middle years of his life (for the designation "middle years" is not an exact one; had the Bible intended to indicate only a general period, it would have used the phrase "in the days of Peleg and Joktan"). The Bible must therefore mean that the confusion of languages took place in the last year of Peleg's life, which (based on the dates of the previous generations in Genesis) occurred 340 years after the Flood, or 1996 years after the creation of the world.

After dealing in the first 10 chapters with the chronology of the period from the creation of the world to the death of Moses, the writer proceeds to determine the dates of the events which occurred after the Israelites, led by Joshua, entered the Holy Land. Here biblical chronology presents many difficulties, dates not being clearly given, and in many cases Seder Olam was used by later biblical commentators as a basis of exegesis. It is known that from the entry of the Israelites into the Holy Land to the time of Jephthah a period of 300 years elapsed. By computing the life periods of the Judges and assuming that Jephthah sent his message (alluding to the 300 years) in the second year of his rule, Seder Olam concludes that the reign of Joshua lasted 28 years. The work places two events in the Book of Judges whose date is unclear (the making of the image for Micah and Battle of Gibeah episode) in the time of Othniel.

I Kings states that Solomon began to build the Temple in Jerusalem in the fourth year of his reign, 480 years after the Exodus, that is, 440 years after the Israelites entered the Holy Land. Thus 140 years passed from the second year of Jephthah to the building of the Temple. Seder Olam concludes that the forty years during which the Israelites were harassed by the Philistines did not begin after the death of Abdon, as it would seem, but after that of Jephthah, and terminated with the death of Samson. Consequently, there was a period of 83 years from the second year of Jephthah to the death of Eli, who ruled 40 years, the last year of Samson being the first of Eli's judgeship.  At that time the Tabernacle was removed from Shiloh, whither it had been transferred from Gilgal, where it had been for 14 years under Joshua; consequently it remained at Shiloh for a period of 369 years, standing all that time on a stone foundation. It is also to be concluded that Samuel judged Israel for 11 years, which with the two years of Saul, the 40 of David's reign, and the four of Solomon's reign, make 57 years, during which the Tabernacle was first at Nob, then at Gibeon.

Period of the monarchy
The chronology of the Kings was more difficult, as there were differences to reconcile between the book of Kings and book of Chronicles. Here especially the author applied the principle of "fragments of years" ("shanim mekutta'ot"), by which he regarded the remainder of the last year of any king's reign as identical with the first year of his successor's. In chapter 20, which closes the second part ("Baba Meẓia"), the author deals with the forty-eight prophets that flourished in the land of Israel. Beginning with Joshua, the author reviews the whole prophetic period which terminated with Haggai, Zechariah, and Malachi, elucidating as he proceeds many obscure points. Thus, the prophet mentioned in Judges 6:8 was, according to Seder Olam, Phinehas, and the man of God that came to Eli was Elkanah.

According to Seder Olam, the prophecy of Obadiah occurred in the time of Amaziah and those of Joel, Nahum, and Habakkuk in the reign of Manasseh. After devoting the 21st chapter to the prophets that lived before the conquest of the land, to the seven prophetesses, and to the seven prophets of the Gentiles, Seder Olam resumes the chronology of the Kings. This continues until the end of chapter 27, where it is calculated that the destruction of the Temple occurred after it had existed 410 years, or 3,338 years after the creation of the world.

Several vital clues are provided by the 2nd-century authors of Seder Olam and the Tosefta, as to the placement of events in relation to the Jubilee and seven year cycle. Although no dates are provided in ancient records, general time-frames for certain events are provided by an inference to their relation to either the First Temple's building or to the First Temple's destruction, and which Temple is said to have stood 410 years. Since, according to Jewish oral tradition, the destruction of the First Temple occurred in 422 BCE, a year which also corresponded to the 1st-year of the seven-year cycle, scholars have sought to plot all events described in the Hebrew Scriptures based on these reference points. Other references include such facts (as brought down in Seder Olam) that the 11th-year of Solomon's reign, when he completed his building of the First Temple, was in the 4th-year of the seven-year cycle, or, similarly, that Jehoiachin's exile began 25 years before the next Jubilee and during the fourth year of a Sabbatical year, or that the 18th-year of Josiah's reign was the year of Jubilee, and that the 14th-year after the First Temple's destruction was also a Jubilee.

Moreover, the interval between the First Temple's destruction in 422 BCE and the Second Temple's destruction in 68 CE is put at 490 years.

In the Jewish custom of recollecting regnal years of kings, the 1st day of the lunar month Nisan marks a New Year for kings, meaning, from this date was calculated the years of the reign of Israelite kings; thus if a king was enthroned in the preceding month, Adar, he begins his second year of reign in the next lunar month, following the 1st of Nisan. Based on this unique way of reckoning regnal years, if King X died in the lunar month Nisan in the year 2022, and King XX succeeded him on the throne in Nisan of 2022, both kings are reckoned as having reigned one year in 2022. All dates provided in the following table showing King David's line of succession are, therefore, made subject to this caveat.

The seventy years of exile

Aside from the disparity between the traditional Jewish method of dating Nebuchadnezzar's year of ascension (put at 441 BCE) and the conventional method of dating for Nebuchadnezzar's first-year of reign (put at 605 BCE) – a disparity of 164 years, there are also historic discrepancies in the chronological list of successive Babylonian kings mentioned by Seder Olam. Seder Olam's assignment of regnal years for the Babylonian kings in that period differs from those assigned by Berossus the Chaldean for the same period. The major difference being that in Seder Olam's chronology (which teaching is followed by the Babylonian Talmud, Megillah 11b) the seventy-year period was defined by only three Babylonian kings, namely: Nebuchadnezzar who reigned 45 years, Evil-merodach who reigned 23 years and Belshazzar who reigned 3 (for a total of 71 years, with one year deducted), whereas Berossus mentions five Babylonian kings for the same period, and that Nebuchadnezzar reigned only 43 years, followed by Evil-merodach who reigned 2 years, who, in turn, was succeeded by Neriglissar who reigned 4 years, followed by Laborosoarchod who reigned 9 months, and, finally, by Nabonnedus (also known as Belshazzar) who reigned 17 years (for a total of 67 years). It is presumed that the author of Seder Olam had not seen the ancient chronological record of Berossus who lists these five Babylonian kings by name, and that the author of Seder Olam copied only those names of Babylonian kings that he could glean from the Hebrew Scriptures, without any knowledge of the fact that the Hebrew Scriptures had merely mentioned those kings directly related to major events in Jewish history, while omitting the rest. Moreover, the actual number of years given for the kings' individual reigns is not mentioned in the Hebrew Scriptures, and is only had either through the record of Berossus, as transmitted by Josephus, or else by those contradictory figures given in the Talmud. 

The Babylonian kings' list in Seder Olam is explained by medieval biblical exegete Saadia Gaon (892–942). In his Judeo-Arabic commentary on the Book of Daniel (9:2), he begins by explaining what is meant by accomplishing "seventy years in the desolation of Jerusalem," saying that this seventy-year period refers not to the destruction of Jerusalem, per se, but rather to the Kingdom of Babylon, in accordance with the biblical verse: "When seventy years are completed for Babylon, I will remember you, and I will fulfill to you my promise and bring you back to this place" (Jeremiah 29:10). Saadia wrote that these seventy years begin with Nebuchadnezzar's ascension to the throne and that he reigned 45 years, and that his son Evil-merodach reigned after him 23 years, and that his son's son after him reigned 3 years, for a total of seventy years. The way in which the rabbis derived 45 years for Nebuchadnezzar's reign was by calculating the beginning of the reign of Evil-merodach which was thought to have been in the 37th year of Jehoiachin's captivity, in accordance with the verse (Jeremiah 52:31): "In the thirty-seventh year of the exile of Jehoiachin king of Judah, in the twelfth month, on the twenty-fifth day of the month, Evil-merodach king of Babylon, in the year of his kingship, he freed Jehoiachin king of Judah and brought him out of prison." When Jehoiachin was first exiled in 433 BCE, Nebuchadnezzar king of Babylon had already been in power eight years; (hence: 8 + 37 = 45). At any rate, Evil-merodach is thought by Seder Olam to have begun his reign in 396 BCE, when Jehoiachin was released from his bonds.

Saadia explains, moreover, how Seder Olam derived 23 years, instead of Berossus' 2 years, for Evil-merodach's reign, saying that since the third-year of Belshazzar's reign is referenced in the Scripture and he is thought by the author of Seder Olam to have died in the third-year of his reign, although the Book of Daniel does not say explicitly that Belshazzar died in the third-year of his reign, it stands to reason that the years in between Nebuchadnezzar's 45-year reign and Belshazzar's 3-year reign, at the least, is collected as 23 years, during which time Evil-merodach reigned. The Talmud refers to this as "deductive reasoning". Belshazzar was thought by the author of Seder Olam to be the mere grandson of Nebuchadnezzar, based on the Scripture: "All the nations shall serve him (i.e. Nebuchadnezzar) and his son (i.e. Evil-merodach) and his grandson, etc." (Jeremiah 27:7). Chroniclers have largely rejected Seder Olam's method of assigning regnal years for the Babylonian kings and have relied, instead, on Berossus and on other archaeological records. Still, the 164–165-year disparity between events described in rabbinic tradition and the same events using conventional dating methods has yet to be explained.

The Persian period
As far as Jewish history is concerned, immediately following the seventy years of exile, the Persian period began. Persia's hegemonic power over the nation of Israel, according to Seder Olam, is said to have extended until the rise of Alexander the Great. Seder Olam names three Persian kings during this time period, starting with the conclusion of the 70-year exile, viz.: Cyrus (said to have reigned an additional 3 years after conquering Babylon, and who jointly ruled with Darius the Mede), followed by Ahasuerus (who is said to have reigned 14 years), and, lastly, Darius, who succeeded Ahasuerus, and in whose 2nd-year of reign the foundation of the Second Temple was laid. These three Persian kings, from the end of Israel's exile under the Babylonians until the Temple was rebuilt in 352 BCE, spanned a period of 18 years. From the time of the Second Temple's building under the Persians, until the rise of Alexander the Great who put away Persian dominion over Israel, the period is put at 34 years, viz., from 352 BCE to 318 BCE. Some scholars have assumed that the allowance (contrary to historical facts) of only 34 years for the Persian domination is necessary to make the chronology agree with the Pharisaic Talmudical interpretation (of Daniel 9:24), that the second exile was to take place after 70 Sabbaths of years (= 490 years) from an "issuing forth of a word" to rebuild Jerusalem. If from this period of 490 years the 70 years of the first Captivity is deducted, and the beginning of Alexander's control of the Land of Israel is placed (in accordance with Talmudic tradition) at 386 years before the destruction of the Second Temple, then there remain only 34 for the Persian rule.

Alternatively, what seems to be a historical inaccuracy in Seder Olam has been explained in a different way. According to Rashi, the 34-year Persian period is the time span between the building of the Second Temple under Darius in 352 BC (according to Jewish calculations) and Alexander the Great's rise to power in 318 BCE. This time-frame, therefore, does not signify the end of the dynasties in Persia, but rather of their rule and hegemony over Israel before Alexander the Great rose to power. The difficulty besetting this explanation, however, lies in the fact that from Darius I who laid the foundation of the Second Temple to Alexander the Great, who brought an end to Persian hegemony over Israel, there are collected no less than 190 years. This would suggest that the author of Seder Olam confounded Darius I with Darius III Codomannus, the latter Darius being a contemporary with Alexander the Great.

As with the Seder Olam's record of the Babylonian kings, so is there difficulty reconciling the accounts in Seder Olam with historical records that mention successive Persian kings, such as that which was documented by Herodotus, Ptolemy and Manetho, beginning with Cyrus' successor, Cambyses (Artaxerxes) the son of Cyrus (who reigned 5 years), followed by the Magi (who reigned 7 months), followed by Darius the son of Hystaspes (who reigned 36 years), and who, in turn, was succeeded by Xerxes (Artaxerxes) b. Darius (who reigned 21 years). He, in turn, was succeeded by Artabanus (who reigned merely 7 months), followed by Artaxerxes, the son of Xerxes the Great, who reigned 41 years. He is said to have also borne the name Ahasuerus. The year of accession for this last king herein named (Ahasuerus) would have, therefore, been long after the Second Temple had already been built.

Second Temple and post-destruction period

The narration continues after the 70 years of the Babylonian captivity with the building of the Second Temple which stood 420 years, and which was destroyed, as may be seen, in the year 3828 of the creation. The 420 years of the Second Temple are divided into the following periods: 34 years of Persian rule while the Temple stood; 180 years of the Greeks; 103 years of the Maccabees; 103 years of the Herods. The period of Herodian rule over Israel, namely, 103 years, refers merely to its hegemony over Israel while the Temple was still standing. The beginning of this period is reckoned during Herod the Great's reign in 35 BC and ends in 68 CE with the destruction of the Second Temple (based on Jewish computations).

From the destruction of the Second Temple, which (according to Seder Olam, ch. 30) occurred at the departure of the Sabbatical year (meaning, the beginning of the 1st-year in a seven-year cycle), to the suppression of the Bar Kochba revolt (or the destruction of Bethar) is given as a period of 52 years. But the text here is very confused and has given rise to various emendations and interpretations, as the historical date for the destruction of the Second Temple is 70 CE and that for the conclusion of the Bar Kochba revolt is 135 CE.

Authorship 

Assuming that this Seder Olam is the same as the Seder Olam mentioned in the Talmud, Jewish authorities generally ascribe its authorship to the well-known Talmudist Jose b. Halafta, on the strength of R. Johanan's statement, "The tanna of Seder Olam was R. Jose". Johanan's comment is supported by the fact that Jose was known as one who occupied himself with Jewish chronology; further, many sayings of R. Jose's quoted in the Talmud are paralleled in Seder Olam.

However, Ratner objected that Seder Olam often conflicts with opinions of Jose's expressed in the Talmud, that Jose is referred to in it in the third person ("R. Jose said"), and finally that mention is made in it of Talmudists that lived later than Jose. For these reasons, he concluded that Jose was not its author; he thinks that Jose was only the principal authority of Seder Olam, and that Johanan's statement, mentioned above, is similar to another statement made by him—"Any anonymous opinion in the Mishnah belongs to Rabbi Meir", although the redactor of the Mishnah was Judah I. Ratner further supposes that R. Johanan himself compiled the work, following generally the opinion of R. Jose. He endeavors to prove this view by showing that many utterances of R. Johanan are taken from Seder Olam.

Ratner's objections, however, are answered by other scholars, who think that in Seder Olam Jose preserved the generally accepted opinions, even when they were contrary to his own, as is clearly indicated in Niddah 46b. Besides, this work, like all the works of the ancient Talmudists, underwent many alternations at the hands of the copyists. Very often, too, finding that the utterance of a later rabbi agreed with Seder Olam, the copyists inserted the name of that rabbi. A careful examination shows that certain additions are later than the latest midrashim, and it may be that Abraham ibn Yarḥi, Isaac Lattes, and Menahem Meïri, who seem to place the redaction of Seder Olam at the time when the Massektot (tractates) Derek Ereẓ Rabbah, the Derek Ereẓ Zuṭa, the Soferim, and other later treatises were composed, may have referred to the work in its present form.

Usage in later rabbinic texts
Besides directly quoting Seder Olam, the Talmud often alludes to it. A passage in Seder Olam (chapter 30) describing the 420 years of four hegemonic powers (Persian, Grecian, Hasmonean and Herodian) appears almost verbatim in the Babylonian Talmud. Often, the phrases "tanya" (= "we learned"), "tana" (= "he learned"), "tanu rabbanan" (= "our teachers learned"), and "amar mar" (= "the teacher said") introduce sentences also found in Seder Olam. In addition, many of its passages have been taken into the Mishnah without any allusion to their source. Seder Olam is not mentioned in the Jerusalem Talmud, although several passages in the latter are based on it. Finally, many of the sayings of Seder Olam have been taken into the Mekhilta, the Sifra, and the Sifre.

Acceptance of Seder Olam Rabbah's chronology was not universal. Among the premodern sources whose chronologies contradict Seder Olam Rabbah are Pirkei deRabbi Eliezer, Josippon, Midrash Lekach Tov, a source quoted by Rashi, Ibn Ezra, Baal HaMaor, Radak, Rashba, Ritva, Ralbag, and Isaac Abarbanel.

Editions
 Seder Olam Rabbah (in print) first appeared at Mantua, in 1514, together with the Seder Olam Zuta, the Megillat Ta'anit, and Abraham ibn David's Sefer ha-Ḳabbalah. It has been reedited several times since then.
 In 1577 Seder Olam Rabbah and Seder Olam Zuṭa were published in Paris, with a Latin translation by Gilbert Genebrard. The former was edited, with a Latin language translation, notes, and introduction, by John Meyer (Amsterdam, 1699).
 Commentaries on the work were written by Jacob Emden, by Elijah Wilna, and by Enoch Zundel b. Joseph.
 The three latest editions prior to 1906 are those of Ratner, A. Marx (who published the first ten chapters, basing the text upon different manuscripts and supplying it with a German language translation and an introduction; Berlin, 1903), and Jeroham Meïr Leiner (containing the commentaries of Jacob Emden and Elijah Wilna, and the editor's annotations under the title Me'r 'Ayin, Warsaw, 1904).
 
 Heinrich W. Guggenheimer (2005), Seder Olam: The Rabbinic View of Biblical Chronology, Lanham, MD: Rowman and Littlefield
 Chaim Milikowsky (2013), Seder Olam: Critical Edition, Commentary, and Introduction (2 vols.), Yad Ben-Zvi: Jerusalem()

See also
 Traditional Jewish chronology

References

Bibliography 

The Jewish Encyclopaedia cites the following works:
Fürst, in Orient, Lit. vii. 547 et seq.;
idem, Bibl. Jud. ii. 107–108;
Grätz, Gesch. 3d ed., iv. 184, and note 14;
A. Marx, introduction to his edition of the Seder Olam;
B. Ratner, Mabo leha-Seder Olam Rabbah;
Steinschneider, Cat. Bodl. cols. 1433–1434;
Weiss, Dor, ii. 257 et seq.;
Winter and Wünsche, Die Jüdische Litteratur, iii. 299 et seq.;
Zunz, G. V. p. 85.
 (Note: page 326 in this edition was p. 354 in 1991).

External links 
English translation of the Seder Olam (INCOMPLETE)
Seder Olam Rabbah - Gilbert Génébrard's Latin translation (Paris 1578)
Jewish Encyclopedia article for Seder Olam Rabbah

2nd-century books
2nd-century texts
Aggadic Midrashim
Hebrew-language chronicles
Hebrew-language religious books
History books about Judaism
Tannaitic literature